Global Brigades (GB) is a nonprofit health and sustainable development organization that works with volunteers from North American and European universities, as well as local staff in Central America and West Africa to partner with communities to reduce inequalities. Global Brigades implements their Holistic Model to meet a community's health and economic goals. The organization's model builds community ownership and executes programs with the end goal of sustainably transitioning to a relationship of impact monitoring.

According to the organization's website, more than 65,000 volunteers from over 800 university clubs have traveled to partner with local staff to provide health and economic development to more than 1 million beneficiaries in 4 countries. Many volunteer groups are officially recognized by their university as a registered international service learning club or organization. Brigades usually consist of 15-50 volunteers who participate in 7 to 10 day brigades. The organization has concentrated its efforts on communities in Honduras, Panama, Nicaragua, and Ghana. Various programs are designed to suit the unique health and economic development goals of each community. Global Brigades currently has 7 different programs: public health, water, engineering, business, medical, dental, and legal empowerment.

Global Brigades' Monitoring and Evaluation team tracks the impact made through its Holistic Model. Before a community is selected as a partner, Global Brigades will research if a community will benefit from the program by performing a needs assessment and collecting baseline community data. Before volunteers arrive, Global Brigades staff also visits with the community to discuss goals, expected outcomes, and responsibilities with the community members. Partner communities then receive volunteers who shadow or assist local engineers, doctors, dentists, and technicians, depending on the task and volunteer's qualifications related to the program.

Between brigade visits, Global Brigades' staff will visit the community to ensure program implementation. Once a community has met their goals in healthcare, WASH and economic development, they no longer receive volunteers and community leaders independently continue the maintenance of infrastructure and grow their knowledge, leadership and economic capacity, with support from Global Brigades' staff on an as-needed basis.

History 
In 2003, co-founders Duffy Casey and Shital Chauhan in partnership with a local Honduran organization, Sociedad Amigos de los Ninos (SAN,) led a group of doctors and Marquette University students to Honduras in order to provide medical care to rural communities. After partnering with co-founders Arman Nadershahi and Liran Amir, Casey and Chauhan formalized a US nonprofit organization named Global Medical Relief. By the end of 2005, the organization had expanded from one university to five, including the University of Southern California, the University of Michigan, and the University of California, Los Angeles.

In 2007, Global Medical Brigades was disbanded and a new 501(c)(3) nonprofit corporation named Global Brigades, Inc., was incorporated in California. Under the leadership of its new CEO, Steven Atamian, Global Brigades focused on "holistic programming." In 2008, Global Brigades continued expanding its programs into new types of brigades, such as Public Health, Human Rights, Microfinance, Architecture, and Environmental. Additionally, the organization experienced its first international expansion into Canada. By 2009, the organization had hired US employees "to manage administrative functions and support program development." The Global Brigades Association was formed in 2011 in an attempt to organize the now global organization into a single international entity.

In 2015, the Inter-American Development Bank granted Global Brigades a $1 million grant to scale its finance and public health programming. The organization also launched its first social enterprise, Cafe Holistico, in partnership with coffee-growing communities in Central America, with the goal to double and triple farmer income while producing gourmet coffee for students to fundraise with.

Holistic Model 
The Holistic Model of Global Brigades focuses on six developmental goals to empower communities. These six goals include: sustainable health systems, daily access to a trained community health worker, in-home clean water, home sanitation infrastructure, community-owned banking, and economic development. These six goals are ordered in what Global Brigades believes to be the most needed in a community, through the extensive research they do of each community.

Global Brigades aligns their Holistic Model with the three United Nations Sustainable Development Goals: Good Health and Well-being, clean water and sanitation, and decent work and economic growth.

Criticism 

The volunteering work of the organization is occasionally advertised about the experience for volunteers. This is sometimes referred to as voluntourism – a portmanteau of volunteering and tourism, and can be seen as being both positive and negative. Global Brigades provides clarification for various points of criticism on their common critiques FAQ.

See also
Global Business Brigades

References

Charities based in California
Development charities based in the United States
International student organizations
International charities
Student organizations established in 2007